Pang Chol-mi (born 26 August 1994) is a North Korean boxer.

She won a medal at the 2019 AIBA Women's World Boxing Championships.

References

1994 births
Living people
North Korean women boxers
People from Chongju
AIBA Women's World Boxing Championships medalists
Flyweight boxers
Asian Games silver medalists for North Korea
Boxers at the 2018 Asian Games
Asian Games medalists in boxing
Medalists at the 2018 Asian Games
21st-century North Korean women